The M49 observation telescope is a 20-power daytime telescope currently used by the US military.  It is used for making ground observations of a target area and the effectiveness of artillery fire. It does not have a mil-dot reticle and is usually supported by the M-15 Tripod.

Post–Cold War military equipment of the United States
Military personal equipment